= Social services in Himachal Pradesh =

l

== Hospitals ==
In 1989, there were 899 public health institutions, including state hospital, twelve district hospitals, 189 primary health centres, besides mainstream Western.and ayurvedic dispensaries and specialized medical institutions. In order to meet the shortage of doctors, a medical college was established in 1967, which is having post-graduate teaching facilities in some branches. The incidence of venereal disease, which was about 17% in 1951, was 2% in 1989. Malaria and small pox has been eradicated. The tuberculosis control programme has been successful and women have outnumbered men in using it.
